The 2016 United States House of Representatives elections in Michigan were held on November 8, 2016, to elect the 14 U.S. representatives from the state of Michigan, one from each of the state's 14 congressional districts. The elections coincided with the 2016 U.S. presidential election, as well as other elections to the House of Representatives, elections to the United States Senate in 33 other states and various state and local elections. The deadline for candidates to file for the August 2 primary election was April 19.

Results summary 
Results of the 2016 House of Representatives elections in Michigan by district:

District 1

When Republican Dan Benishek first ran to represent Michigan's 1st congressional district in the 2010 elections, he pledged to serve no more than three terms. In March 2015, he decided to run for a fourth term as the district's representative. But he changed his mind in September and decided not to seek re-election.

On June 24, Michigan Democratic Party chairman Lon Johnson declared his run for the seat. Former Democratic nominee Jerry Cannon also announced his candidacy. Republican state senator Tom Casperson announced his run in November 2015. Casperson was challenged in the Republican primary by former state legislator Jason Allen who announced he was running in January 2016 and retired U.S. Marine Jack Bergman who declared in March. In January 2016, Benishek endorsed Casperson's candidacy.

In the August 2 primary, Jack Bergman won the GOP nomination and Lon Johnson won the Democratic nomination.

Republican primary

Candidates

Nominee
 Jack Bergman, retired United States Marine Corps lieutenant general

Eliminated in primary
 Jason Allen, former state senator
 Tom Casperson, state senator

Declined
 Dan Benishek, incumbent U.S. Representative

Results

Democratic primary

Candidates

Nominee
 Lon Johnson, former Michigan Democratic Party chairman

Eliminated in primary
 Jerry Cannon, retired Michigan Army National Guard Major General, former Kalkaska County Sheriff and nominee for this seat in 2014

Declined
 Scott Dianda, state representative

Results

Libertarian convention

Nominated
 Diane Bostow, Gwinn resident

General election

Endorsements

Predictions

Results

District 2

Republican Incumbent Rep. Bill Huizenga is running for re-election. His Democratic opponent is Dennis Murphy, and his Libertarian opponent is  Kentwood City Commissioner Erwin Haas.

Republican primary

Candidates

Nominee
 Bill Huizenga, incumbent U.S. Representative

Results

Democratic primary

Candidates

Nominee
 Dennis Murphy, engineer

Results

General election

Endorsements

Results

District 3

Republican Incumbent Rep. Justin Amash is running for re-election and his Democratic opponent is Douglas Smith.

Republican primary

Candidates

Nominee
 Justin Amash, incumbent U.S. Representative

Results

Democratic primary

Candidates

Nominee
 Douglas Smith

Results

General election

Results

District 4

Republican Incumbent Rep. John Moolenaar is running for re-election and his Libertarian opponent is Leonard Schwartz. Keith Butkovich is the candidate for the Natural Law Party, George Zimmer for the U.S. Taxpayers Party and George Salvi for the Green Party. There was no Democratic opponent on the August primary ballot, but Debra Wirth launched a successful write-in campaign to be the Democratic nominee for the November election.

Republican primary

Candidates

Nominee
 John Moolenaar, incumbent U.S. Representative

Results

Democratic primary

Candidates

Nominee
 Debra Friedell Wirth, attorney and nominee for this seat in 2012 (Write-in)

Results

General election

Results

District 5

Democratic incumbent Rep. Dan Kildee is running for re-election and his Republican opponent is Al Hardwick.

Democratic primary

Candidates

Nominee
 Dan Kildee, incumbent U.S. Representative

Results

Republican primary

Candidates

Nominee
 Allen Hardwick, computer repairman and nominee for this seat in 2014

Results

Libertarian convention

Nominated
Steve Sluka

General election

Endorsements

Results

District 6

Incumbent Fred Upton is seeking re-election to his House seat. His Democratic challenger in 2014, Paul Clements, is running again.

Republican primary

Candidates

Nominee
 Fred Upton, incumbent U.S. Representative

Results

Democratic primary

Candidates

Nominee
 Paul Clements, political science professor and nominee for this seat in 2014

Results

Libertarian convention

Nominated
 Lorence Wenke, former state representative

General election

Endorsements

Predictions

Results

District 7

The 7th district is located in Southern Michigan. The incumbent is Republican Tim Walberg, who has represented the district since 2011 and previously represented the district from 2007 to 2009. He was re-elected with 53% of the vote in 2014 and the district has a PVI of R+3. Walberg is being challenged by Doug North. Democratic state representative Gretchen Driskell, the former mayor of Saline, has announced that she will run against Walberg in 2016, As will Libertarian Ken Proctor.  Walberg won the Republican nomination.

Republican primary

Candidates

Nominee
 Tim Walberg, incumbent U.S. Representative

Eliminated in primary
 Doug North

Results

Democratic primary

Candidates

Nominee
 Gretchen Driskell, state representative

Declined
 Pam Byrnes, former state representative and nominee for this seat in 2014

Results

Libertarian convention

Nominated
 Ken Proctor

General election

Endorsements

Polling

Predictions

Results

District 8

Freshman Republican incumbent Mike Bishop ran for re-election. He ran unopposed in the Republican primary.

Republican primary

Candidates

Nominee
 Mike Bishop, incumbent U.S. Representative

Results

Democratic primary
Two candidates were originally slated to face each other in the Democratic primary. They were former actress Melissa Gilbert (Little House on the Prairie) and a former president of the Screen Actors Guild, and Linda Keefe.

Gilbert withdrew from the race in May 2016 due to health issues, and at that time Keefe did not appear to have collected enough valid petition signatures to be placed on the ballot.

On July 6, 2016, Democrats introduced 29-year-old Suzanna Shkreli, an Assistant Macomb County Prosecutor to be the party's nominee. At the time of Shkreli's announcement, it was still unclear if Michigan Secretary of State Ruth Johnson would allow Gilbert to be removed from the ballot. Johnson said that the Office of the Secretary of State would not make a ruling until after the state's August 2 primary. Gilbert's name remained on the ballot.

On August 2, Gilbert received the most votes in the Democratic primary, receiving 28,810 votes, despite previously announcing her withdrawal from the race. Michigan Democratic Party Chairman Brandon Dillon said the day after that the party would begin the process to remove Gilbert from the November ballot and replace her with Shkreli within 48 hours. Bishop's campaign described Gilbert's attempt to be removed from the ballot as unprecedented. A Democratic campaign spokesman said they had retained legal counsel for the process.

The Michigan state elections director said that Gilbert's name could be removed from the ballot in the general election. On August 22, 2016, the state board of canvassers allowed Gilbert's name to be replaced on the November ballot with that of Shkreli.

Nominee 
 Suzanna Shkreli, Assistant Macomb County Prosecutor

Failed to qualify
 Linda Keefe, former Windsor Township Clerk (Disqualified from primary ballot for lack of signatures)

Withdrawn
 Melissa Gilbert, actress and former president of the Screen Actors Guild.

Results

Libertarian convention

Nominated
 Jeff Wood

General election

Endorsements

Predictions

Polling

Results

District 9

Democratic Incumbent Rep. Sander Levin is running for re-election. His Republican challenger is Christopher Morse, and his Libertarian opponent is Matt Orlando.

Democratic primary

Candidates

Nominee
 Sander Levin, incumbent U.S. Representative

Results

Republican primary

Candidates

Nominee
 Christopher Morse

Results

Libertarian convention

Nominated
 Matthew Orlando

General election

Endorsements

Results

District 10

Republican incumbent Candice Miller, who has represented the 10th district since 2003, was not running for reelection. State representative Tony Forlini,  State Senator Phil Pavlov, businessman Paul Mitchell, former state senator Alan Sanborn, and retired military veteran David VanAssche are seeking the Republican nomination to succeed Miller. State Senator Jack Brandenburg considered entering into the race, but declared in January 2016 that he would not run. Paul Mitchell won the Republican nomination.

Republican primary

Candidates

Nominee
 Paul Mitchell, businessman

Eliminated in primary
 Tony Forlini, state representative
 Phil Pavlov, state senator
 Alan Sanborn, former state senator
 David VanAssche

Withdrew
 Michael Flynn, Shelby Township Treasurer

Results

Democratic primary

Candidates

Nominee
 Frank Acavitti, Jr.

Results

Libertarian convention

Nominated
 Lisa Gioia

General election

Endorsements

Results

District 11

The 11th district is located northwest of Detroit. The incumbent is Republican Dave Trott, who has represented the district since 2015. He was elected in 2014, winning the general election with 55.9% of the vote. He is running for re-election.  Anil Kumar is his Democratic opponent, and Jonathan Osment is his Libertarian opponent. Kerry Bentivolio, who represented the 11th District from 2013 to 2015 and lost to Trott in the 2014 Republican primary, announced on July 21, 2016, that he planned to seek the seat as an independent after losing to Osment in the Libertarian convention.

Republican primary

Candidates

Nominee
 Dave Trott, incumbent U.S. Representative

Results

Democratic primary

Candidates

Nominee
 Anil Kumar, physician

Results

Libertarian convention

Nominated
 Jonathan Osment

Independent
 Kerry Bentivolio, former U.S. Representative

General election

Endorsements

Results

District 12

Democratic first term congresswoman Debbie Dingell ran for re-election and is unopposed in the primary. Jeff Jones was the Republican challenger, a Taylor resident, a former independent United States Senate candidate in 2014. Also running was Tom Bagwell of Wyandotte, libertarian activist and former Ypsilanti Township Park Commissioner won the Libertarian Party nomination for District 12 on May 14, 2016, in Lansing, Michigan.

Democratic primary

Candidates

Nominee
 Debbie Dingell, incumbent U.S. Representative

Results

Republican primary

Candidates

Nominee
 Jeff Jones

Results

Libertarian convention

Nominated
Tom Bagwell

General election

Endorsements

Results

District 13

John Conyers, a Democrat, the incumbent representative in the 13th district, has served 26 terms in Congress and is the Dean of the United States House of Representatives. Detroit and City Clerk Janice Winfrey will run against Conyers in the Democratic Party primary election. Jeff Gorman is running on the Republican side, and Tiffany Hayden is running on the Libertarian side. Conyers won the nomination.

Democratic primary

Candidates

Nominee
 John Conyers, incumbent U.S. Representative

Defeated in primary
 Janice Winfrey, Detroit city clerk

Failed to qualify
 Kenneth Garner

Results

Republican primary

Candidates

Nominee
 Jeff Gorman

Results

Libertarian convention

Nominated
 Tiffany Hayden

General election

Endorsements

Results

District 14

Democratic Incumbent Rep. Brenda Lawrence is seeking re-election and had two Democratic challengers, Terrance Morrison and Vanessa Moss. Lawrence won the Democratic nomination. The Republican candidate is Howard Klausner and the Libertarian candidate is Gregory Creswell.

Democratic primary

Candidates

Nominee
 Brenda Lawrence, incumbent U.S. Representative

Defeated in primary
 Terrance Morrison
 Vanessa Moss

Results

Republican primary

Candidates

Nominee
 Howard Klausner

Results

Libertarian convention

Nominated
 Gregory Creswell

General election

Endorsements

Results

References

External links
U.S. House elections in Michigan, 2016 at Ballotpedia
Campaign contributions at OpenSecrets
Candidate and Committee Viewer at Federal Election Commission

House
Michigan
2016